Lexis may refer to:
Lexis (linguistics), the total bank of words and phrases of a particular language, the artifact of which is known as a lexicon
Lexis (Aristotle), a complete group of words in a language
LexisNexis, part of the LexisNexis online information database
Lexis diagram a demographic visualisation for showing age and period of cohort members on the same figure
Lexis Journal in English Lexicology published by OpenEdition.org

People with the name
Wilhelm Lexis (1837–1914), German statistician, economist, and social scientist

See also 
 Lexus, an automobile brand
 Lexi, a Germanic given name